Legaci may refer to: 

Legaci, an R&B group from the San Francisco Bay Area
LEGACI (Land use, Economic development, Growth, Agriculture, Conservation, and Investment) Grants from the Great Valley Center of California
Legaci Refrigeration Systems, manufactured by Revco, a division of Thermo Fisher Scientific, Inc.